The Bushcaddy L-162 Max is a Canadian kit aircraft that was designed by Sean Gilmore and produced by Canadian Light Aircraft Sales and Service and most recently by Bushcaddy. The aircraft is supplied as a kit for amateur construction.

Design and development
The L-162 was developed from the Bushcaddy L-160 as a result of customer demand for a freight aircraft that could also provide room for a second row of seats behind the pilot and passenger seats.

The L-162 features a strut-braced high-wing, a two-seats-in-side-by-side configuration enclosed cockpit, fixed conventional landing gear, or optionally tricycle landing gear, and a single engine in tractor configuration. Floats and skis can also be fitted.

The aircraft fuselage is made with a frame of welded 6061-T6 aluminum square tubing, covered in 6061-T6 sheet. Its  span wing employs V-struts with jury struts. Cabin access is via two fold-up doors.

Construction time for the factory kit is estimated at 1200 hours. Twelve examples had been completed and flown by December 2011.

Specifications (L-162 Max)

References

External links

Official website

Homebuilt aircraft
Single-engined tractor aircraft
High-wing aircraft